Manyueyuan National Forest Recreation Area is a forest located in Sanxia District, New Taipei, Taiwan.

Geology
The forest spans over an area of 637 hectares at an elevation of 300–1,700 meters with an annual mean temperature of 19.9°C. The northern part of the forest shares a border with Mount Beichatian.

Facilities
The forest consists of a walking trail connected to Dongyanshan Forest Recreation Area with an length of 1,727 meters. It has campsites at the base of Mount Beichatian. The total length of the forest walking trail is 1,210 meters.

Transportation
The forest is accessible by bus or taxi from Yingge Station of Taiwan Railways.

See also
 Geography of Taiwan

References

Campsites in Taiwan
Geography of New Taipei
National forest recreation areas in Taiwan
Tourist attractions in New Taipei